Philippe Buache (born La Neuville-au-Pont, 7 February 1700; died Paris, 24 January 1773) was a French geographer, known for inventing a new system of geography and popularizing this field.

Life and work 
Buache was trained under the geographer Guillaume Delisle, whose daughter he married, and whom he succeeded in the Académie des sciences in 1730.

Buache was nominated first geographer of the king in 1729. He established the division of the world by seas and river systems. He believed in a southern continent, an hypothesis which was confirmed by later discoveries.  In 1754, he published an "Atlas physique."  He also wrote several pamphlets.

His nephew, Jean Nicolas Buache (born La Neuville-au-Pont, 15 February 1741; died Paris, 21 November 1825), was also a geographer of the king.

Works
 Considérations géographiques et physiques sur les découvertes nouvelles dans la grande mer (Paris, 1754). This contains a chart of the western coast of North America.
 Le parallèle des fleuves des quatre parties du monde pour servir a déterminer la hauteur des montagnes (1757)
 Mémoire sur la traversée de la mer glaciale arctique (1759). This contains his hypothesis of an Alaskan peninsula.
 Considérations géographiques sur les terres australes et antarctiques (1761)

See also
Sea of the West

References

External links

 The French West Indies Collection, including geographical writings of cartographer Philippe Buache, are available for research use at the Historical Society of Pennsylvania.

French geographers
1700 births
1773 deaths
Members of the French Academy of Sciences